Finding Sofía is a 2016 comedy film written and directed by Nico Casavecchia. The film is Casavecchia's first feature film and was produced by 1stAveMachine. It premiered in 2016 on the Buenos Aires International Festival of Independent Cinema and was included in the festival's Argentine official competition. The picture features Sam Huntington, Andrea Carballo, Rafael Spregelburd, and Sofía Brihet.

Plot
Alex (Sam Huntington) is a conflicted animation filmmaker living in Brooklyn. His “Dancing Tomatoes”  animation  video  went  viral  two  years  ago  and  since  then  Alex has been trying to prove to the world that he can do more than “funny videos, and dancing things”. When he’s pressured by his friend Josh to sign a contract with a yogurt brand to develop the “dancing fruits show” and plunge deeper into artistic superficiality, Alex, instead, buys a ticket to Argentina.
The plan is to meet with Sofia (Andrea Carballo), a girl that he started an online relationship  with after she left a nasty comment about his work, whom he has never seen in person. Alex’s hope to find love and substance will be confronted after finding Sofía  living  on  an  island  in  the  outskirts  of  Buenos  Aires  with  her intimidating artist boyfriend Víctor (Rafael Spregelburd) and his assistant Flor (Sofía Brihet). Alex will be forced to be a fish out of the water and try to capture Sofía’s interest or come back to his old life and sign the contract.

Production
Finding Sofia is the first feature film produced and financed by 1stAveMachine, a company that so far focused on video, digital and experimental content. It's also Casavecchia's debut in the big screen, though he's an awarded animated shorts filmmaker.
The film was written inspired by the dilemma of being a filmmaker in a world already saturated with images. The movie portrays several pieces of Alex's animation (made by Casavecchia himself) and Victor's paintings (made for the film by Argentine painter, Juan José Cambre).
It was filmed on an island in El Tigre, a region in the outskirts north of Buenos Aires crossed by rivers.

References

External links
 
 

2016 films
Argentine comedy films
American comedy films
2016 comedy films
2010s Spanish-language films
2010s English-language films
2016 multilingual films
Argentine multilingual films
American multilingual films
2010s American films
2010s Argentine films